Assheton Curzon, 1st Viscount Curzon (2 February 1730 – 21 March 1820), styled Lord Curzon between 1794 and 1802, was a British Tory politician.

Background and education
Curzon was the second son of Sir Nathaniel Curzon, 4th Baronet of Kedleston, Derbyshire and Mary, daughter of Sir Ralph Assheton, 2nd Baronet. Nathaniel Curzon, 1st Baron Scarsdale, was his elder brother (see Viscount Scarsdale for earlier history of the family). He was educated at Brasenose College, Oxford.

Political career
Curzon sat as Member of Parliament for Clitheroe from 1754 to 1777 and from 1792 to 1794. In the latter year he was raised to the peerage as Baron Curzon, of Penn in the County of Buckingham, and in 1802 he was further honoured when he was made Viscount Curzon, of Penn in the County of Buckingham.

Homes
In 1752 Curzon acquired Hagley Hall, Rugeley in Staffordshire, remodelling the house and redesigning the grounds. In 1760 he built Penn House near Amersham in Buckinghamshire, replacing an earlier Tudor building with a red brick country mansion.

Family
Lord Curzon married firstly Esther Hanmer, daughter of William Hanmer and Elizabeth Jennens (sister of Charles Jennens), in 1756. After her death in July 1764, he married secondly Dorothy, daughter of Sir Robert Grosvenor, 6th Baronet, in 1766. After her death on 24 February 1774, he married thirdly Anna Margaretta, daughter of Amos Meredith and sister of Sir William Meredith, 3rd Baronet, in 1777. She died in June 1804. There were two sons and four daughters from the two first marriages.

Lord Curzon died in March 1820, aged 90. His son from his first marriage, The Hon. Penn Assheton Curzon, had predeceased him, and he was therefore succeeded by the latter's third but eldest surviving son by his marriage to Sophia Howe, suo jure Baroness Howe (the eldest daughter of Richard Howe, 1st Earl Howe (of the first creation), and wife Mary Hartop), Richard, who was created Earl Howe in 1821.

His son by his second wife, The Honourable Robert Curzon, represented Clitheroe in Parliament for many years and was the father of Robert Curzon, 14th Baron Zouche. Robert inherited Hagley Hall and various other unentailed properties.

His daughter, The Hon. Charlotte Curzon, married Dugdale Stratford Dugdale of the historic Stratford Family, with their descendants becoming the Dugdale Baronets in 1936.

Notes

References

External links

1730 births
1820 deaths
Peers of Great Britain created by George III
Viscounts in the Peerage of the United Kingdom
Younger sons of baronets
Alumni of Brasenose College, Oxford
Members of the Parliament of Great Britain for English constituencies
British MPs 1754–1761
British MPs 1761–1768
British MPs 1768–1774
British MPs 1774–1780
British MPs 1790–1796
Tory members of the Parliament of Great Britain
Assheton